In the 1933 Tour de France, Belgium, Italy, Switzerland, Germany and France entered national teams, consisting of eight cyclists. Additionally, 40 touriste-routiers, cyclists without a team, entered the race.

The French team has been named the best collection of pre-war cyclists. The Belgian team had talented riders, but were split between French-speaking and Dutch-speaking cyclists.
The Italian team was headed by Learco Guerra. Guerra had won three stages in the 1933 Giro d'Italia and had been world champion. Tour director Henri Desgrange had named Guerra as probable winner of the race.

By team

By rider

By nationality

References

1933 Tour de France
1933